Dreaming with the Dead is the full-length studio debut by death metal band Ripping Corpse, released in 1991.  Among the ranks of the band was guitarist Erik Rutan, who would go on to become a temporary member of Morbid Angel and also front his own band Hate Eternal (he would also go on to produce records for several death metal bands; among them, his own, Cannibal Corpse, Vital Remains, Six Feet Under and Goatwhore).  Worth noting as well is that Shaune Kelley would also play with Rutan's band as well, later on in their career.

Track listing
All songs written by Scott Ruth & Shaune Kelley, except where noted.
"Sweetness" 2:55
"Dreaming with the Dead" 1:45
"Anti God" 3:08
"Glorious Depravity" 1:59
"Beyond Humanity" 4:18
"Feeling Pleasure Through Pain" 3:34
"Through the Skin to the Soul" (Ruth, Kelly, Erik Rutan) 2:26
"Rift of Hate" 3:58
"Deeper Demons" 1:51
"Sickness of Will" 2:16
"Chuggin' Pus" 2:24
"Seduction of the Innocent" 3:38

Lyrical themes
"Deeper Demons" is about the life and suicide of pornographic actress Shauna Grant.  The lyrics question why such a tragic fate befell "little Colleen."
"Seduction of the Innocent" is about the book by psychiatrist Fredric Wertham bearing the same title.  The song's lyrics denounce Dr. Wertham as a "righteous slime".

Personnel
Scott Ruth: Vocals
Shaune Kelley: Rhythm and lead guitar
Erik Rutan: Rhythm and lead guitar
Dave Bizzigotti: Bass
Brandon Thomas: Drums

Production
Arranged and produced by Ripping Corpse
Recorded and mixed by Bill Klatt; assisted by Dave Ellinwood
All songs published by Kraze/Maze America

References

External links
Discogs entry

1991 debut albums
Ripping Corpse albums